C. Ellis Black (born July 28, 1942) is an American politician. He is a member of the Georgia State Senate from the 8th District, serving since 2015. He is a member of the Republican party. Black also served in the Georgia House of Representatives from 2001 to 2015.

References

|-

|-

|-

1942 births
Living people
Republican Party Georgia (U.S. state) state senators
Republican Party members of the Georgia House of Representatives
21st-century American politicians